Kim Jae-young may refer to:

Kim Jae-young (author)
Kim Jae-young (actor)
Kim Jae-young (baseball)

See also
Kim Jae-yeon (disambiguation)